High School Affiliated to Beijing Institute of Technology (High School Affiliated to BIT) (Chinese: 北京理工大学附属中学 (北京理工附中)) is a public secondary school located on the bank of Kunyu River in Haidian, Beijing. Founded in 1950, High School Affiliated to BIT formed a distinctive educational characteristic "humanity as foundation, technology as feature. " High School Affiliated to BIT was identified as Beijing Model General High School in 2004.

History
High School Affiliated to Beijing Institute of Technology was founded on 14 December 1950. Minister of education of People's Republic of China Ma Xulun, vice minister of education Wei Que and deputy mayor of Beijing Wu Han attended opening ceremony.

High School Affiliated to BIT was established in 1950 as Beijing Crash High School of Workers and Peasants. It was renamed as "High School Affiliated to Beijing Industrial College" in 1962, and was renamed as "High School Affiliated to BIT" in 1990.

In 1980, High School Affiliated to BIT was identified as

In 2004, High School Affiliated to BIT was identified as Beijing Model General High School.

Color 
The school color is not officially declared, yet the uniforms are purple, also, the school building is partly painted purple.

References

Beijing Institute of Technology
Haidian District